Harry's Bar may refer to:

Drinking establishments and restaurants
 Harry's Bar (Rome), Italy, a historic bar and restaurant featured in La Dolce Vita
 Harry's Bar (Venice), Italy, home of the Bellini and Carpaccio
 Harry's New York Bar, Paris, France, said to be the birthplace of several classic cocktails
 Harry's Bar (London), Mayfair, London, a private members dining club established by Mark Birley
 Harry's Bar, Wigan, England, venue of the World Pie Eating Championship
 Harry's Bar, Holland Village
 Harry's Bar, Marshall Street, Syracuse, New York, United States
 Harry’s Bar, Cernobbio (CO), Italy

Other uses
 Harry's Bar, a 2002 album by Gordon Haskell

See also

 Sir Harry's Bar, in the Waldorf Astoria New York, U.S.